The 1951 Vanderbilt Commodores football team represented Vanderbilt University during the 1951 college football season. The team's head coach was Bill Edwards, who was in his third season as the Commodores' head coach.  Members of the Southeastern Conference, the Commodores played their home games at Dudley Field in Nashville, Tennessee.

Schedule

References

Vanderbilt
Vanderbilt Commodores football seasons
Vanderbilt Commodores football